Women's singles at the 1999 Pan American Games was won by María Vento-Kabchi of Venezuela.

Medalists

Draw

Final rounds

Women's singles